Dinosaurus! is a 1960 science fiction film directed by Irvin Yeaworth and produced by Jack H. Harris.

Plot
The film is about an American engineering team led by Bart (Ward Ramsey) building a harbor on a Caribbean island when they accidentally uncover two dinosaurs that have been frozen in suspended animation for millions of years. They are a Brontosaurus and a Tyrannosaurus rex. That night, during a storm, the beasts are struck by lightning and come back to life. The islanders have no idea that the dinosaurs are alive because of the storm and are now roaming the island. Also awakened is a caveman (Gregg Martell), whom initially is unknown to the islanders as he was buried some distance away. The Tyrannosaurus hunts across the island, attacking a beach guard and trolley cart. The caveman meanwhile stumbles into, and is bewildered, by a modern house. There he meets and befriends an island boy with a love of dinosaurs, Julio. The caveman introduces Julio to the Brontosaurus, whom he is friendly to, and they go on a ride across the island.

The Tyrannosaurus catches up to them and menaces Julio and the caveman, leading to it battling the Brontosaurus as the others hide in an abandoned mine shaft. After the Tyrannosaurus seemingly kills the Brontosaurus by biting its neck, it noticed the humans hiding in the mine and begins furiously kicking and clawing at it. The engineers briefly drive the Tyrannosaurus back by lobbing a Molotov cocktail into its mouth. As Bart goes in to save Julio and the others, the cavemman sacrifices himself holding up a collapsing beam to keep the mine shaft from caving in entirely, allowing others to escape. The Brontosaurus, still alive, accidentally stumbles away and into a quicksand pit that swallows it up.

Meanwhile, the islanders have found refuge from the Tyrannosaurus by hiding in the old fortress, which is protected by a ring of burning fuel. To ensure the Tyrannosaurus does not get in, Bart drives out to face the beast in a mechanical digger. They duel on the edge of an island cliff and, after a tense fight, the Tyrannosaurus is knocked into water, ending the island terror. The film ends with a picture of the apparently dead Tyrannosaurus on the sea bed. In an ending similar to his previous films The Blob and 4D Man, the words "THE END" are shown, followed by a question mark.

Production
Parts of the film were shot on location. Some location shooting took place on the Island of St. Croix, in the U.S. Virgin Islands. The dinosaurs were filmed using the technique of stop-motion animation as well as puppets for close-ups.

During special-effects work on this picture, the crew used their Brontosaurus model and miniature jungle set to film a shot for an episode of TV's The Twilight Zone (1959) called "The Odyssey of Flight 33". A shot of the Tyrannosaurus was also borrowed for "The Secret of Gilligan's Island", a third-season episode of Gilligan's Island in which Gilligan dreams the castaways are all cave dwellers living on the island in the Stone Age.

The roars and growls of the Tyrannosaurus were used numerous times for creatures in The Outer Limits (1963 TV series)  in episodes such as  The Invisibles, and can also be heard from various other film monsters.

The toy dinosaurs Julio shows everyone at the cantina were Brontosaurus and Tyrannosaurus rex plastic figures made by Marx Toys.

The leading role was intended for Steve McQueen, who starred in The Blob two years earlier, also produced by Harris and directed by Yeaworth. McQueen passed on the film to make The Magnificent Seven instead.

Release
The film had its premiere on June 24, 1960, at the Joy Theater in New Orleans and then opened in Cincinnati, Ohio; Hartford, Connecticut; Providence, Rhode Island; Springfield and Worcester, Massachusetts; Cedar Rapids, Iowa; Baton Rouge and Shreveport, Louisiana.

Reception and legacy
Howard Thompson of The New York Times wrote, "If ever there was a tired, synthetic, plodding sample of movie junk, it's this 'epic' about two prehistoric animals hauled from an underwater deep-freeze by some island engineers."

The film was adapted into a comic book of the same name.

It was parodied by RiffTrax on August 28, 2014.

See also
 List of stop motion films
 List of American films of 1960

References

External links 
 
 
 
 RiffTrax treatment on official YouTube channel

1960 animated films
1960 films
American fantasy films
1960s English-language films
1960s fantasy films
Films about dinosaurs
Puppet films
Films using stop-motion animation
Films set in the Caribbean
Films shot in the United States Virgin Islands
Universal Pictures films
Films adapted into comics
Films scored by Ronald Stein
Resurrection in film
Films about cavemen
Films directed by Irvin Yeaworth
1960s American films